Gülsüm Şeyma Tatar (February 6, 1985 in Kars, Turkey) is a world and European champion Turkish female boxer. After having boxed seven years for the sports club Fenerbahçe Boxing in Istanbul, she transferred in 2010 to Birlikspor in Kayseri, Turkey.

She comes from a family of boxers. Her uncle, Kibar Tatar, was a notable Turkish boxer, and her brother was interested in boxing. She was educated in physical education at Fırat University in Elazığ.

She became gold medalist in the lightweight (60 kg) division at the 2004 European Women's Boxing Championships held in Riccione, Italy before she participated at the 3rd World Women's Boxing Championship held between September 25 and October 2, 2005 in Podolsk, Russia, and fought a silver medal.
At the 2008 AIBA Women's World Boxing Championship held in Ningbo City, China, Gülsüm Tatar won the gold medal in the light welter (63 kg) division.

She was awarded as the "best boxer" after winning gold in the light welterweight (64 kg) division at the 5th European Union Women's Championships held in Keszthely, Hungary between August 3–8, 2010. Reigning European and World champion Gülsüm Tatar has been officially invited to the 2012 London Olympics, at which women's boxing will debut. She will represent Turkey at the Olympics as the first female boxer.

As of December 1, 2010, Gülsüm Tatar ranked first in her weight category at the "World Women's Rankings" list.

At the 2011 Women's European Amateur Boxing Championships held in Rotterdam, Netherlands, she won her third European gold medal.

India's L Sarita Devi (60 kg) stunned defending champion and world number 2 Gulsum Tatar of Turkey to enter the pre-quarterfinals of the seventh World Women's Boxing Championships in Qinhuangdao, China on May 14, 2012.

References 

Fenerbahçe boxers
Turkish women boxers
1985 births
Sportspeople from Kars
Living people
Light-welterweight boxers
European champions for Turkey
AIBA Women's World Boxing Championships medalists
20th-century Turkish sportswomen
21st-century Turkish sportswomen